Wortley could refer to:

Places
Wortley, Gloucestershire, a location in England
Wortley, Leeds, a district of Leeds, West Yorkshire, England
Wortley, South Yorkshire, a village south of Barnsley, South Yorkshire, England
Wortley railway station
Wortley Hall, a stately home in Wortley, South Yorkshire
Wortley Rural District

People

Alexander Wortley (born 1899–1980), English naval veteran eccentric
Dana Wortley (born 1959), Australian politician
Sir Edward Wortley Montagu (1678–1761), British Ambassador to the Ottoman Empire
Edward Wortley Montagu (1713–1776), English author
Elise Wortley (born 1990), British explorer
George C. Wortley (b. 1926), American politician
James Stuart-Wortley (disambiguation), several people
Lady Mary Wortley Montagu (1689–1762), English aristocrat and writer
Russell Wortley, Australian politician
Stuart-Wortley, several people